The 28th Wisconsin Infantry Regiment was a volunteer infantry regiment that served in the Union Army during the American Civil War.

Service
The 28th Wisconsin was organized at Milwaukee, Wisconsin, and mustered into Federal service October 14, 1862.   Six companies were from Waukesha County, Wisconsin, four companies were from Walworth County, Wisconsin.

The regiment was mustered out on August 23, 1865.

Casualties
The 28th Wisconsin suffered 1 officer and 12 enlisted men killed in action or who later died of their wounds, plus another 6 officers and 221 enlisted men who died of disease, for a total of 240 fatalities.

Commanders
 Colonel James M. Lewis
 Colonel Edmund B. Gray

Battles Fought
Battle on 24 March 1863
Battle on 26 April 1863
Battle at Helena, Arkansas, on 4 July 1863
Battle at Montana Elba, Arkansas, on 30 March 1864
Battle at Mark's Mills, Arkansas, on 25 April 1864
Battle on 19 January 1865
Battle at Spanish Fort, Alabama, on 27–31 March 1865
Battle at Spanish Fort, Alabama, on 2–4 April 1865

See also

 List of Wisconsin Civil War units
 Wisconsin in the American Civil War

Notes

References
The Civil War Archive

External links
28th Wisconsin Volunteer Infantry History
Wisconsin Civil War Regiments 28th Wis

Military units and formations established in 1862
Military units and formations disestablished in 1865
Units and formations of the Union Army from Wisconsin
1862 establishments in Wisconsin
1865 disestablishments in Wisconsin